Eugenitin is a chromone derivative, a type of phenolic compound found in cloves. It has also been isolated from the fungal species Cylindrocarpon sp. C.M.I. 127996.

Synthesis
Eugenitin has also synthethised using the Kostanecki sodium acetate-acetic anhydride cyclization of C-methylphloracetophenone in 1952 and from visnagin, khellin and khellol in 1953.

See also
 Eugenin

References

Chromones
Phenol ethers
Phenols